Phloeocecis is a genus of moths in the family Gelechiidae. It contains the single species Phloeocecis cherregella, which is found in Algeria.

References

Gnorimoschemini